The Embassy of the United States of America in Rome is the diplomatic mission of the United States of America to the Italian Republic. The embassy's chancery is situated in the Palazzo Margherita, Via Vittorio Veneto, Rome. The United States also maintains consulates general in Milan, Florence and Naples, and consular agencies in Genoa, Palermo, and Venice. The diplomatic mission comprises several sections and offices, such as the public affairs section and its cultural office. President Biden has yet to choose a new ambassador, so the U.S. is currently represented by Chargé d’Affaires ad interim Shawn P Crowley.

Two other American diplomatic missions are located in Rome. The Embassy of the United States to the Holy See, previously located on Aventine Hill, moved to new headquarters in September 2015 in a separate building on the same compound as the United States Embassy Rome, while the United States Mission to the UN Agencies in Rome is located in a third building on the same compound since December 2011, when they moved from their former location at Piazza del Popolo.

Terrorism
On June 10, 1987, a rocket attack hit the embassy, however no one was hurt. Junzo Okudaira, a member of the Japanese Red Army, was suspected to have carried out the attack.

See also

Embassy of Italy, Washington, D.C.
Italy–United States relations

References

External links
 Embassy Home Page

Rome
United States
Italy–United States relations
Attacks on diplomatic missions of the United States